= Cultural Development Press =

Chinese state publisher

The Cultural Development Press (Chinese: 文化发展出版社) is a publisher in Beijing, China. The China Institute of Printing Science and Technology (Chinese: 中国印刷科学技术研究所) established the Printing Industry Press (Chinese: 印刷工业出版社) in February 1981. By 2016, the press had been renamed to the Cultural Development Press.
